Upatoi Creek is a  river in western Georgia, just outside Columbus. It runs from Upatoi, through South Columbus, and to the Chattahoochee River.

The stream flows to the west and forms the boundary between Talbot and Marion counties and Talbot and Chattahoochee counties. The stream continues to the west and southwest through the northern margin of Fort Benning. The stream continues to the southwest forming the boundary between Muscogee and Chattahoochee counties.

Upatoi is a name derived from the Muskogean language meaning either "sheet-like covering" or "bullfrog".

See also
List of rivers of Georgia

References 

2Upatoi
Rivers of Georgia (U.S. state)
Rivers of Muscogee County, Georgia